William Paul Cockshott (born 16 March 1952) is a Scottish computer scientist, Marxian economist and a reader at the University of Glasgow. Since 1993 he has authored multiple works in the tradition of scientific socialism, most notably Towards a New Socialism and How the World Works.

Scientific career 
Cockshott earned a BA in Economics (1974) from Manchester University, an MSc (1976) in Computer Science from Heriot Watt University and a PhD in Computer Science from Edinburgh University (1982).

He has made contributions in the fields of image compression, 3D television, parallel compilers and medical imaging, but became known to a wider audience for his proposals in the multi-disciplinary area of economic computability, most notably as co-author, along the economist , of the book Towards a New Socialism, in which they strongly advocate the use of cybernetics for efficient and democratic planning of a complex socialist economy.

He proposes a moneyless socialist economy, akin to Karl Marx's description of a socialist society in Critique of the Gotha Programme, realized by today's computer technology:

Political views 
In the 1970s, Cockshott was a member of the British and Irish Communist Organisation, but he and several other members became unhappy with B&ICO's position on workers' control. Cockshott and several other B&ICO members resigned and formed a new party, the Communist Organisation in the British Isles.

Cockshott advocates for a system of a moneyless economy based on a computerized planned economy and direct democracy. He has criticized the economic calculation problem on the grounds that planning can be made feasible via computerization and allocation based on labor time.

Published works 
Cockshott, P. (1990). Ps-Algol Implementations: Applications in Persistent Object Oriented Programming, Ellis Horwood Ltd. 
Cockshott, P. (1990). A Compiler Writer's Toolbox: Interactive Compilers for PCs With Turbo Pascal, Ellis Horwood Ltd. 
Cockshott, P., Cottrell, A. (1993). Towards a New Socialism, Spokesman. 
Cockshott, P., Renfrew K. (2004). SIMD Programming Manual for Linux and Windows, Springer. 
Cockshott, P. (2010). Transition to 21st Century Socialism in the European Union, Lulu. 
Cockshott, P. (2011). Glasgow Pascal Compiler with vector extensions, Lulu. 
Cockshott, P., Zachariah, D. (2012). Arguments for Socialism, Lulu. 
Cockshott, P., Cottrell, A., Michaelson, G., Wright, I., Yakovenko, V. (2012). Classical Econophysics, Routledge. 
Cockshott, P., Mackenzie, L., Michaelson, G. (2015). Computation and its Limits, Oxford University Press. 
Cockshott, P. (2019). How the World Works: The Story of Human Labor from Prehistory to the Modern Day, Monthly Review Press.

References

External links 
 Paul Cockshott's YouTube channel
 Paul Cockshott's blog
 "Paul Cockshott - Towards a new Socialism (1/3)". Video produced by Oliver Ressler on Paul Cockshott and his planned economy-model. Transcription  of a video by O. Ressler, recorded in Glasgow, GB, 25 min., 2006
 Towards a new socialism, complete book download.
 Len Brewster on "Towards a new Socialism? by W. Paul Cockshott and Allin F. Cottrell. (Nottingham, U.K.: Spokesman Books, 1993)", Review Essay, The Quarterly Journal of Austrian Economics, Vol.7, No.1 (Spring 2004): 65–77.; Paul Cockshott, "Notes for a critique of Brewster" (20 June 2009).

Living people
Scottish computer scientists
1952 births
Marxist theorists
People from Edinburgh
Alumni of the University of Edinburgh
Academics of the University of Glasgow
Marxian economists